The Military Ordinariate of Croatia is a military ordinariate of the Roman Catholic Church. Immediately subject to the Holy See, it provides pastoral care to Roman Catholics serving in the Croatian Armed Forces and their families.

History
The military ordinariate was established by Pope John Paul II on 25 April 1997.

Military ordinaries
 Juraj Jezerinac (25 April 1997 – 2015)
 Jure Bogdan (2015–Present)

See also

References

 Vojni ordinarijat u Republici Hrvatskoj (Official website in Croatian)
 Military Ordinariate of Croatia  (Catholic-Hierarchy)
 Vojni ordinarijat u Republici Hrvatskoj (Croatia) (GCatholic.org)

Croatia
Croatia
1997 establishments in Croatia